Victor Colin Belsham  (1925/1926 – 4 June 2006) was a New Zealand rugby league player and referee who represented New Zealand (Heritage No. 316). His brother, Sel, also played for the New Zealand national rugby league team, including in one match that was controlled by Vic. He was also prominent in cricket and squash.

Rugby league career
From the Point Chevalier club, Belsham became an Auckland representative and was selected for the New Zealand national rugby league team tour of Australia in 1948. He was the understudy to Abbie Graham and did not play a match.

After retirement Belsham became a referee to gain experience for coaching. He enjoyed it however and remained as a referee. Belsham controlled three matches at the 1957 World Cup and also controlled four Test matches between New Zealand, France and Great Britain. In 1958 Belsham controlled the inaugural Auckland Rugby League grand final. He is one of only four New Zealanders to play for New Zealand and referee a test match.

Cricket career
Belsham was also a cricketer and played twice for Auckland and once for the Auckland Colts between 1952 and 1959.

Squash career
In later life Belsham became involved in Squash. For his involvement he was made a life member of both Qsquash (Queensland) and Squash Australia. The "Vic Belsham Trophy" is awarded to the winner of trans-tasman matches.

In the 1986 Queen's Birthday Honours Belsham was made a Member of the Order of Australia (AM) for "service to the sport of squash".

Belsham died on 4 June 2006 in Brisbane aged 80.

References

1920s births
2006 deaths
New Zealand rugby league players
New Zealand national rugby league team players
New Zealand rugby league referees
Auckland rugby league team players
Point Chevalier Pirates players
New Zealand male squash players
New Zealand cricketers
Auckland cricketers
Australian male squash players
Rugby league five-eighths
Members of the Order of Australia